Muriel Roy Bolton (March 19, 1908 – March 4, 1983) was an American film and television writer active in the 1940s through the 1960s.

Biography 
Born Muriel Roy in Chicago, Illinois, to Camille Roy and Amanda Anderson, she attended the University of Illinois at Urbana-Champaign before she moved to Hollywood.

In 1945, Bolton worked for Signet Films; she was paid $3000. Her credits include a number of Henry Aldrich films, in addition to dozens of episodes of CBS's The Millionaire. She also wrote a number of plays including Angels 'Round My Bed.

In 1947, she published a novel titled The Golden Porcupine, a historical romance set in 15th-century France. Bolton also published stories in magazines including Redbook and Cosmopolitan.

Her first marriage was to William Bolton; she later married educator Norman Mennes in 1957. She died of a heart attack in 1983 in her Los Feliz, Los Angeles, home.

Selected filmography 

 Mystery in Mexico (1948) (story)
 The Amazing Mr. X (1948)
 Mickey (1948)
 My Name Is Julia Ross (1945)
 Grissly's Millions (1945)
 Meet Miss Bobby Socks (1944)
 She's a Sweetheart (1944)
 Henry Plays Cupid (1944)
 You Can't Ration Love (1944) (story)
 Passport to Destiny (1944)
 Henry: Boy Scout (1944)
 Henry Haunts a House (1943)
 The Good Fellows (1943) (uncredited)
 Henry Swings It (1943)
 Henry Aldrich, Editor (1942)
 This Time for Keeps (1942)

References 

1908 births
1983 deaths
American women screenwriters
American women novelists
University of Illinois Urbana-Champaign alumni
20th-century American women writers
20th-century American screenwriters